Hongshan station is a station of Line 4 and Line 6 of the Shenzhen Metro. Line 4 platforms opened on 16 June 2011 and Line 6 platforms opened on 18 August 2020.

Station layout

Exits

Gallery

References

Railway stations in Guangdong
Shenzhen Metro stations
Longhua District, Shenzhen
Railway stations in China opened in 2011